Atopomyrmex is a small genus of arboreal ants in the subfamily Myrmicinae. The genus is known from the Afrotropics, where they nest in living wood and forage in the vegetation or on the ground.

Species
 Atopomyrmex calpocalycola Snelling, 1992
 Atopomyrmex cryptoceroides Emery, 1892
 Atopomyrmex mocquerysi André, 1889

References

External links

Myrmicinae
Ant genera
Hymenoptera of Africa